Lusk (also Atpontley) is an unincorporated community in Bledsoe County, Tennessee, United States.  It lies along U.S. Route 127 southwest of the city of Pikeville, the county seat of Bledsoe County.

The variant name Atpontley is a compound of the names of three coal miners: Atkinson, Dupont, and Finley.

References

Unincorporated communities in Bledsoe County, Tennessee
Unincorporated communities in Tennessee